Plech is a municipality  in the district of Bayreuth in Bavaria in Germany.

References

Bayreuth (district)